Moissac is a commune in the Tarn-et-Garonne department in the Occitanie region in southern France. The town is situated at the confluence of the rivers Garonne and Tarn at the Canal de Garonne. Route nationale N113 was constructed through the town and between Valence-d'Agen and Castelsarrasin. It is served by Moissac station on the Bordeaux-Toulouse line.

History
Initially Moissac was part of the department of Lot. In 1808, Napoleon decreed the city be attached to the new department of Tarn-et-Garonne. It was the chief town of the district from 1800 to 1926.

Moissac was heavily damaged in March 1930 by flooding of the Tarn, which devastated much of southwestern France. It was counted as a 100-year flood. One hundred twenty people were reported to have died in the city.

In 2020, National Rally politician Romain Lopez was elected mayor.

Moissac Abbey

Moissac is known internationally for the artistic heritage preserved in the medieval Moissac Abbey.  This church is a site on the World Heritage Site Routes of Santiago de Compostela in France.

Population

Waterways

There are important waterways in Moissac: the Tarn flows through the centre of town, as does the Canal de Garonne (formerly Canal latéral à la Garonne), the extension of the Canal du Midi from Toulouse to Bordeaux. Together, these two canals are sometimes known as the Canal des deux mers (lit. canal of the two seas) connecting the Atlantic Ocean with the Mediterranean Sea.

Twin towns
  Astorga, Spain

See also
 Communes of the Tarn-et-Garonne department
 Greengage plum
 André Abbal

References

External links

 Moissac tourist office  website
 The Devils of Moissac Online Exhibition
 Abbaye St-Pierre Cloister and Portal Photos

Communes of Tarn-et-Garonne
Quercy
World Heritage Sites in France